Dipodium punctatum, commonly known as the blotched hyacinth-orchid, is a leafless orchid that is a native to eastern and south-eastern continental Australia. In summer it produces a tall flowering stem with up to sixty pale to bright pink flowers with heavy red blotches. A widespread and common species it is often confused with D. roseum and some authorities regard it as a synonym of D. squamatum.

Description
Dipodium punctatum is a leafless, tuberous, perennial, mycoheterotrophic herb. The centre lobe has a band of pink to mauve hairs, the band narrow near the base but widening towards the tip of the lobe. Flowering occurs from November to March.

This orchid is often confused with D. roseum but has a narrower band of labellum hairs, darker blotches and less recurved sepals and petals.

Taxonomy and naming
This orchid was first formally described in 1804 by English botanist James Edward Smith in the journal Exotic Botany. Smith gave it the name Dendrobium punctatum. In 1810, Scottish botanist Robert Brown placed the species in his newly described genus Dipodium, publishing the change in Prodromus Florae Novae Hollandiae et Insulae Van Diemen. The specific epithet (punctatum) is derived from the Latin word punctum meaning "little hole", "dot" or "point".

The  World Checklist of Selected Plant Families (WCSP) records this species as a synonym of Dipodium squamatum.

Distribution and habitat
The blotched hyacinth orchid is common in woodland and forest along the coast and ranges of New South Wales, the Australian Capital Territory and Queensland. It is also widespread in Victoria especially in the east of the state. There are a few records of the species from the far south-east corner of South Australia. 

Dipodium punctatum does not occur in Tasmania. Plants in that state previously classified as D. punctatum are currently referred to D. roseum, which was described in 1991.

In South Australia, D. punctatum is listed as endangered. Populations currently included within D. roseum and D. campanulatum were originally part of a wider circumscription of D. punctatum in South Australia.

References

 Dipodium punctatum Ecology of Cumberland Plain Woodland, Royal Botanic Gardens, Sydney
 Dipodium punctatum ABC

External links

Herbarium specimen of Dendrobium punctatum (The Linnean Society of London)
 Youtube video of D. punctatum

Orchids of New South Wales
Orchids of the Australian Capital Territory
Orchids of Queensland
Orchids of South Australia
Orchids of Victoria (Australia)
Endemic orchids of Australia
punctatum
Plants described in 1804